Majda Sepe, born Majda Bernard, (2 July 1937 – 11 April 2006) was one of the most successful and well recognized Slovenian singers in the time of Yugoslavia and was one of the most renowned singers of the Golden Age of Slovenian folk music.

Biography

Early life
Her mother fled the Primorska region because of Italian Fascism, her father was from Skofja Loka, a town near Ljubljana. They lived together in Ljubljana where he worked as an ambulance driver and she was a clerk. Their first child was a boy they named Marjan, who wanted a baby sister. 4 years later he also got one. Majda Bernard was born July 2, 1937 in Ljubljana.

The family lived on the Ljubljana Castle. As a teenager Majda practiced ballet and expressive dance, having lessons with Meta Vidmar, because she wanted to be a singer and an actress among other things. She attended primary and secondary school for music. During her education in Jože Plečnik high school she attended singing lessons with Franci Schiffrer who was a well-known opera singer and father of Mojmir (later Sepe). Because she was interested in many activities she applied as a model in 1953 while still a high school student, and was also accepted. This was the beginning of her modelling career that lasted till the end of the 1950s. On one of her fashion shows she also met Mojmir where he was a musician in the accompanying band. The highlight of her very successful career was her appearance in a knitwear fashion show in Moscow, Leningrad, and Riga in 1959.

Elda Viler described Majda as such: "I am a greatly impressed by her appearance; wonderful hair a golden colour, nice figure. She was a true Nordic type of woman, very attractive."

Career

Her music career began early. She had studied singing in Music School in Ljubljana. At age 19 she made a music performance in Paris, France with Ljubljana Jazz Musicians.
For years later, in 1960, she joined the Jazz Festival in Bled. Jazz and Chanson became her favourite sorts of music. Majda Sepe's name is very strongly connected with Slovenian most recognized and famous music festival - Slovenska popevka. She first took part in 1962 when it was just starting up and continued to appear every year until 1977, only missing out in 1968.

Majda performed some of the greatest hits of the Festival and soon, she became a well known and popular Slovenian performer. She worked together with her husband, Slovenian composer and songwriter, Mojmir Sepe. Together with Majda, they made a perfect team: a talented singer and a successful song writer. Some of her best-known songs are:  (cover of Waterloo Road), etc. These number one music hits are today considered evergreens. 0

Death and afterward
On 10 September 2006 a concert was performed in Ljubljana in loving memory of Majda Sepe and her work. Slovenian singers such as Elda Viler, Alenka Godec, Nuša Derenda, Darja Švajger, Vita Mavrič, Irena Vrčkovnik, Oto Pestner, Lado Leskovar, and Anžej Dežan performed her songs with Orchestra Simfonika and Big Band RTV Slovenija.

Notes

External links
 

1937 births
2006 deaths
Musicians from Ljubljana
Slovenian jazz singers
Slovenian women singers
Slovenian pop singers
20th-century Slovenian women singers